The 1960 Saskatchewan general election was held on June 8, 1960, to elect members of the Legislative Assembly of Saskatchewan.

The Co-operative Commonwealth Federation of Thomas C. Douglas campaigned promising Medicare, a public medical insurance and delivery plan for all of Saskatchewan, and it was re-elected with a slightly increased majority. The CCF won despite organized opposition from the College of Physicians and Surgeons, which told voters that Medicare would take freedom of choice away from patients and would cause doctors to leave the province.

A year later, Douglas passed legislation making Saskatchewan the first province in Canada to have Medicare. The same year, Douglas resigned as leader of the CCF to become leader of the federal New Democratic Party, handing over the premiership to Woodrow Lloyd.

Campaigns
In addition to the elections campaigns led by the four main political parties, the College of Physicians and Surgeons launched a full-scale campaign against Medicare.

CCF
The Saskatchewan CCF, led by Douglas, proposed "a province-wide medical care program." Douglas assured voters that the only thing that would change about the medical system would be that the doctor would bill the medical care plan instead of billing the patient. The CCF won the election, with 37 seats, one more than in the previous election in 1956.

Progressive Conservatives
The Progressive Conservative Party of Saskatchewan, led by Martin Pederson, a 38-year-old farmer, won considerable support in the cities (Regina and Saskatoon), but they were not able to win any seats in the legislature. The 15 federal Progressive Conservative Members of Parliament from Saskatchewan campaigned for the provincial party. The main issue for the party was not Medicare but farm prosperity. It promised farmers grant of a $1 per acre ($247/km2) from the province, with a maximum of $100. It claimed that this program would be made possible by assistance from the federal government of Prime Minister John Diefenbaker, from Saskatchewan himself and a former leader of the Saskatchewan PCs. On Medicare, it only proposed a Royal Commission.

Liberals
The Liberal Party of Saskatchewan, led by Ross Thatcher of Moose Jaw, claimed that Pederson's promise of land payments was tantamount to bribery. It won 17 seats, and formed the official opposition. Thatcher, a former member of the CCF, was concerned about the economic problems in the province. He was neutral on Medicare and stated that it would be up to the people of Saskatchewan to decide whether or not the province would implement it. The party was also in favour of pre-paid medical insurance.

The Liberals were concerned that the economic development of Saskatchewan had lagged behind the rest of Canada during the Douglas era. They were also concerned about the proposed merger of the CCF and the Canadian Labour Congress, which later led to the formation of the New Democratic Party.

Social Credit
The Social Credit Party of Saskatchewan was led by the 38-year-old Martin Kelln, who had strong views about monetary reform and the social credit movement, and was viewed by many as a serious threat to the ruling CCF government. However, the party was unable to win any seats. It was the only party openly opposed to Medicare.

College of Physicians and Surgeons
The College of Physisicans and Surgeons ran a campaign against Medicare. Almost all doctors in Saskatchewan were against it, and many had pamphlets available in their offices. The college paid for anti-Medicare ads in newspapers and on television. The college used scare tactics to frighten the public by claiming, for example, that patients would just be numbers and that patients would be assigned new doctors based on their names or that the government would be able to pass on medical secrets of patients.

Electoral system
In this election, Saskatchewan used a mixture of single-member districts, electing through First past the post, and multiple-member districts, electing through Plurality block voting.

Results

Notes:
1Compared to Labor-Progressive Party in 1956.
2One seat declared void.

Percentages

See also
List of political parties in Saskatchewan
List of Saskatchewan provincial electoral districts

Further reading

References

External links
Saskatchewan Archives Board – Election Results By Electoral Division

1960 elections in Canada
1960 in Saskatchewan
1960
June 1960 events in Canada